Sebenzile Elliot Williams is a South African Anglican bishop: since 2010 he has been the inaugural Bishop of Mbhashe.

Notes

21st-century Anglican Church of Southern Africa bishops
Anglican bishops of Mbhashe
Living people
Year of birth missing (living people)